Shari Ahmad was the 5th Commander of the Royal Brunei Armed Forces (RBAF) from 1999 until 2001, and the 2nd Commander of the Royal Brunei Land Forces (RBLF) from 1994 until 1999.

Education 
Among the 72 cadet officers who graduated from Officer Cadet School, Portsea on 9 December 1966, Major General Walter S. McKinnon presented awards to two Bruneian cadets whom are Shari Ahmad and B.M. Ali.

Military career
In 1969, Lieutenant Colonel H.F. Burrows presented individual awards to the members of the Platoon No.5 of 'B' Company for winning the Seri Begawan Shield's shooting competition, held at Berakas Camp. As the winning team's captain, Shari Ahmad received the Seri Begawan Shield for his achievement. On 11 August 1994, he was appointed as the commander of the RBLF, succeeding Husin Ahmad in that role before being replaced himself by Jaafar Abdul Aziz on 28 October 1999. 

Major General Shari took command of the Royal Brunei Armed Forces on 31 August 1999. He attended the 2nd Asia-Pacific Chiefs of Defence Conference in Honolulu, that same year. On 16 February 2001, Shari made a farewell visit to the Members of the Armed Forces of the Royal Brunei Armed Services (ATPBDB) at Bolkiah Garrison. Later on 2 April, Sultan Hassanal Bolkiah accepted an audience to him and his successor.

Personal life 
His residence was reported to be in Rampayoh of Labi, Belait District. After his time in the military, he became the President of Veterans Association Royal Brunei Armed Forces (VARBAF). Notably, he previously held the position of President of the Veterans Confederation of ASEAN (Veconac). Launched in November 2014, the double-decker cruise ship MV Sentosa is run by a local business, Sha-Zan Marine, under the direction of the retired Shari Ahmad.

Honours
Shari was bestowed the title of Yang Dimuliakan (His Excellency) Pehin Datu Padukaraja. Moreover, he has earned the following honours;
  Order of Paduka Keberanian Laila Terbilang First Class (DPKT) – Dato Paduka Seri
  Order of Pahlawan Negara Brunei First Class (PSPNB) – Dato Seri Pahlawan
  Order of Paduka Seri Laila Jasa Second Class (DSLJ) – Dato Seri Laila Jasa (11 February 1976)
  Order of Setia Negara Brunei Third Class (SNB)
  Order of Seri Paduka Mahkota Brunei Third Class (SMB)
  Meritorious Service Medal (PJK) – (2 June 1976)
  Medal for Service to State (PIKB)
  Silver Jubilee Medal – (5 October 1992)
  Royal Brunei Armed Forces Silver Jubilee Medal – (31 May 1986)
  Proclamation of Independence Medal – (1 January 1984)

  General Service Medal (Armed Forces)
  Long Service Medal (Armed Forces)

References

Living people
Bruneian military leaders
Year of birth missing (living people)